Francis George Bonner (12 October 1924 - 5 January 2013) was an Australian rugby league footballer who played for South Sydney in the 1940s.

Bonner, a fullback, made his first-grade debut in the 1944 NSWRFL season, having started the year with the thirds. He impressed as a goalkicker in just his second first-grade appearance, with seven goals from nine attempts in a win over Eastern Suburbs. Following 24 premiership games, he left South Sydney for the Corrimal Cougars in 1948.

References

External links
Frank Bonner at Rugby League project

1924 births
2013 deaths
Australian rugby league players
South Sydney Rabbitohs players
Rugby league fullbacks